The 1994 French motorcycle Grand Prix was the ninth round of the 1994 Grand Prix motorcycle racing season. It took place on 17 July 1994 at the Bugatti Circuit located in Le Mans, France.

500 cc classification

 Daryl Beattie crashed in the first practice and his foot got stuck between the chain and rear sprocket which resulted in his toes being amputated.

250 cc classification

125 cc classification

References

French motorcycle Grand Prix
French
Motorcycle Grand Prix